is a railway station on the Shinano Railway Kita-Shinano Line in the city of Nagano, Japan, operated by the third-sector railway operating company Shinano Railway

Lines
Sansai Station is served by the 37.3 km Kita-Shinano Line, and is 6.8 kilometers from the starting point of the line at Nagano Station. Some trains of the Iiyama Line continue past the nominal terminus of the line at Toyono Station and terminal at Nagano Station, stopping at this station en route.

Station layout
The station consists of two opposed side platforms serving two tracks. The platforms are connected by both a level crossing and an underground passage.

Platforms

History
The station opened on 8 January 1958. With the privatization of Japanese National Railways (JNR) on 1 April 1987, the station came under the control of East Japan Railway Company (JR East).

From this date, Sansai Station was transferred to the ownership of the third-sector operating company Shinano Railway.

Passenger statistics
In fiscal 2016,  the station was used by an average of 1,424 passengers daily (boarding passengers only).

Surrounding area
Seisen Jogakuin College

See also
List of railway stations in Japan

References

External links

 

Railway stations in Nagano (city)
Iiyama Line
Railway stations in Japan opened in 1958
Kita-Shinano Line